The Guo River (Chinese: Guō Hé, 涡河) is a major tributary river on the left bank of Huai River. The source of Guo River is near Kaifeng, Henan province, which is very close to Yellow River. This river is generally an abandoned course of Yellow River. It does not have a remarkable water source and is recharged mainly by groundwater, rainwater and other rivers. Due to the influence of the changing path of Yellow River, the path of Guo River changed frequently throughout the history. The last time Guo River changed its path was during the 1938 Huayuankou flood of the Yellow River. Guo River reaches the Huai River in Anhui province. Guo River is almost entirely located on the plain. The total head of the entire Guo River is only about 59 meters which indicates a very low gradient. The lower section of Guo River is navigable.

Rivers of Henan
Rivers of Anhui